The Mad Doctor is a Mickey Mouse cartoon released in 1933. It is known as the first appearance of the title character "The Mad Doctor", or "Dr. XXX". It was the 52nd Mickey Mouse short film, and the second of that year.

Plot 

The plot centers on the title character, a mad scientist who has kidnapped Mickey's dog, Pluto. Mickey tries to rescue him before the doctor can perform his experiment: putting Pluto's head to the body of a chicken in order to see if a puppy will hatch from an egg (that is if the end result will "bark or crow or cackle"). Mickey battles his way through booby traps and animated skeletons before eventually getting caught and strapped onto a table to get cut open by a buzz-saw, forcing Mickey to suck in his belly, trembling. The scene then fades to Mickey asleep in bed and suddenly woken up by a fly, whose buzzing resembles the whirring of the saw. Not yet realizing the events were only a nightmare, Mickey shouts for Pluto, who eagerly jumps onto Mickey's bed with his doghouse and chain still attached to his collar.

Voice cast 
 Mickey Mouse: Walt Disney
 Pluto: Pinto Colvig
 The Mad Doctor: Allan Watson

Reception
The short's horror genre overtones made it unusual for a Mickey Mouse cartoon. Some theaters refused to show it, believing it to be too scary for kids. At one time, for this reason, it was banned entirely in the United Kingdom, as well as Nazi Germany. Due to the perceived scariness the short was never reissued. 

On February 10, 1933, The Film Daily said: "One of the liveliest animated cartoons to come along, and plenty comical."

Later Analysis 
Further study of the short suggests that it serves as a spoof of Universal's Horror films of the time, in particular Frankenstein and the horror genre more broadly. Other analysis purports that the short is an examination of "the machine age and its discontents" as Mickey encounters the "horror of science technology" when facing The Mad Doctor. The short is also indicative of the evolution of Mickey's character from a more mischievous one to an "innocuous hero, devoid of obvious desire and aggression" as the character selflessly attempts rescuing Pluto. To this end, Mickey is only allowed to engage in the "surreal and absurd situations" that the short portrays by having the ending reveal that it was all a dream.

Legacy
A photo of the Mad Doctor can be seen on a hospital wall during the Roger Rabbit short Tummy Trouble. In 1988, a cel from the short featuring Mickey looking down "a staircase of skeletons and included the background scenery" sold at an auction for $63,800. In 1992, more artwork from the short was sold at auction for $18,700.

Video Games 
The Mad Doctor short also served as the basis for, and title of, the second level in the video game, Mickey Mania: The Timeless Adventures of Mickey Mouse. A depiction of the Mad Doctor is also used as the cover art for the game, and the Mad Doctor is a boss that Mickey must defeat. He also appears as a major character in Epic Mickey and its sequel. The video game Kingdom Hearts III features a Game & Watch style mini-game based on the short.

Home media
The short was released on December 2, 2002 on Walt Disney Treasures: Mickey Mouse in Black and White.

In addition, this cartoon is one of a few Disney shorts that lapsed into the public domain, and can be found on many low budget VHS tapes and DVDs, usually paired with "Minnie's Yoo Hoo" and "The Spirit of '43".

See also
Mickey Mouse (film series)

References

External links

1933 films
1933 animated films
1930s science fiction films
1933 horror films
Censorship in Germany
1930s Disney animated short films
Disney controversies
Films directed by David Hand
Films produced by Walt Disney
Mad scientist films
Mickey Mouse short films
Films about nightmares
Film controversies
Film censorship in the United Kingdom
Film controversies in the United Kingdom
American black-and-white films
Animated films about animals
American science fiction films
American horror films
1930s American films